Hitler: A Career is a 1977 West German documentary film about the career of Adolf Hitler directed by Christian Herrendoerfer and Joachim Fest and written by Fest, a German historian.

Premise 
The film, exclusively utilising archival footage, closely examines Hitler's rise to power, and also aims to explain why people living in Germany loved Hitler. Fest argues that Hitler was a clever, scheming and incredibly adaptable politician, who was keen to exploit any weakness he saw in the political system and in the masses who, humiliated by the outcome of WWI, were willing to support a voice that spoke for them.

Release 
The film was initially received with controversy among some critics, especially in Germany. American historian Deborah Lipstadt wrote that by featuring extensive clips of Hitler from propaganda films and entirely ignoring the Holocaust, Fest had engaged in a glorification of a murderer.

References

External links 

Documentary films about Adolf Hitler